The Suhareka City Stadium is a soccer-specific stadium in Suhareka, Kosovo. It is currently used mostly for football matches and is the home ground of FC Ballkani in the Football Superleague of Kosovo.

Notes and references
Notes:

References

Suva Reka